Gangamopteris is a genus of Carboniferous-Permian plants, very similar to Glossopteris.  Previously, it was classified as fern with reproduction by seed. The genus is usually only applied to leaves, making it a form taxon. Gangamopteris dominates some coal deposits, such as those of the Beacon Supergroup.

In Paleorrota geopark in Rio Grande do Sul, Brazil, were found Gangamopteris obovata. Were located on the Mina Morro do Papaléo in Mariana Pimentel and Quitéria in Pantano Grande. Dating from the Permian and were in the Rio Bonito Formation. In the town of Cachoeira do Sul, met Gangamopteris sulriograndensis were discovered.

References

Prehistoric plant genera
Pteridospermatophyta
Carboniferous plants
Permian plants